(The Branded or The Stigmatized) is an opera in three acts by Franz Schreker with a German-language libretto by the composer.

Composition history
Schreker wrote the libretto in 1911 at the request of composer Alexander Zemlinsky based on the 1904 play Hidalla by German playwright Frank Wedekind. However, Schreker decided to set the text himself, and completed the opera in 1915. The score was first published by Universal Edition Vienna.

Performance history

An expanded concert version of the overture to the opera, entitled "", was performed at the Vienna Musikverein on 8 February 1914 by the Vienna Philharmonic, conducted by Felix Weingartner.

The complete opera was first performed on 25 April 1918 by the Oper Frankfurt, conducted by Ludwig Rottenberg. It established Schreker as the pre-eminent opera composer of his generation and won him the support of Germany's foremost music critic Paul Bekker. Before the composer's music was banned in 1933, due to his Jewish ancestry, a further two dozen productions followed in fifteen different cities in Germany and Austria. The playbill of the first performance in Vienna, in January 1920, mentions 66 previous performances of the opera in five different opera houses (Frankfurt, Nuremberg, Munich, Dresden and Breslau).

Conductor Michael Gielen revived the opera at the Oper Frankfurt in 1979. In the performance, which was recorded, William Cochran appeared as Alviano Salvago, Barry Mora as Tamare, June Card as Carlotta, and Günter Reich as the Duke. It was staged, albeit heavily cut, at the Salzburg Festival in 2005, directed by Nikolaus Lehnhoff and conducted by Kent Nagano, with Robert Brubaker (Alviano) and Anne Schwanewilms (Carlotta) in the leading roles.

The American premiere was staged by Los Angeles Opera on 10 April 2010, followed by three more performances. James Conlon conducted. Robert Brubaker (Alviano), Anja Kampe (Carlotta) and Martin Gantner (Tamare) sang the principal roles. These performances were hailed by critics as the first-ever performance of a Schreker opera in the Western Hemisphere.

Back in Europe, the same month, Die Gezeichneten received six performances at the Teatro Massimo in Palermo in a production by Graham Vick. The French premiere took place in March 2015, at the Opéra de Lyon in a production by David Bösch. It was conducted by Alejo Pérez. The opera returned to Munich in a new production at Bavarian State Opera in July 2017 as part of the Munich Opera Festival. Krzysztof Warlikowski directed, Ingo Metzmacher conducted.

Roles
{| class="wikitable"
|+
!Role
!Voice type
!Premiere cast, 25 April 1918(Conductor: Ludwig Rottenberg)
|-
|Duke Antoniotto Adorno || bass || Walter Schneider
|-
|Count Vitelozzo Tamare || baritone || Robert vom Scheidt
|-
|Lodovico Nardi, Podestà || bass || Willy Roos
|-
|Carlotta Nardi, his daughter || soprano || Else Gentner-Fischer
|-
|Alviano Salvago, a Genoan nobleman || tenor || Karl Ziegler
|-
|Guidobald Usodimare, a Genoan nobleman || tenor || Hermann Schramm
|-
|Menaldo Negroni, a Genoan nobleman || tenor || Erik Wirl
|-
|Michelotto Cibo, a Genoan nobleman || baritone || Rudolf Brinkmann
|-
|Gonsalvo Fieschi, a Genoan nobleman || baritone || Fritz Meurs
|-
|Julian Pinelli, a Genoan nobleman || bass || Josef Gareis
|-
|Paolo Calvi, a Genoan nobleman || bass || Josef Gareis
|-
|Capitaneo di Giustizia || bass || Leo Kaplan
|-
|Ginevra Scotti || soprano || Marta Uersfeld
|-
|Martuccia, Alviano's housekeeper || contralto || Marie Welling-Bertram
|-
|Pietro, a cutthroat || tenor ||
|-
|A youth || tenor || Franz Wartenberg
|-
|His friend || bass || Willy Schürmann
|-
|A young girl || soprano || Elisabeth Kandt
|-
|First senator || tenor || Erik Wirl
|-
|Second senator || baritone || Rudolf Brinkmann
|-
|Third senator || bass || Josef Gareis
|-
|A servant || bass ||
|-
|A maidservant || mezzo-soprano || Anita Franz
|-
|First citizen || tenor ||
|-
|Second citizen || baritone || Carl Bauermann
|-
|Third citizen || bass || Willy Schürmann
|-
|Father || bass || Paul Neumann
|-
|Mother || contralto || Frieda Hammerschmidt
|-
|A small boy, (silent part) || ||
|-
|First young man || tenor || Franz Wartenberg
|-
|Second young man || baritone || Carl Bauermann
|-
|Third young man || bass || Willy Schürmann
|-
|A giant citizen || bass || Karl Kröff
|}

Instrumentation
The orchestral score requires:
4 flutes (4th doubling piccolo), 4 oboes (4th doubling English horn), 4 clarinets in A/B-flat (4th doubling E-flat clarinet and basset horn), bass clarinet in B-flat, 2 bassoons, contrabassoon
6 horns in F, 4 trumpets in C (4th doubling bass trumpet), 3 trombones, tuba
timpani, xylophone, glockenspiel, bells, castanets, triangle, cymbals, tam-tam, tambourine, snare drum, bass drum, tenor drum (3 players)
2 harps, celesta, piano
strings (violins I, violins II, violas, violoncellos, double basses).

Synopsis
The opera is set in 16th-century Genoa

Act 1
The young Genoan nobleman Alviano Salvago, hunchbacked and deformed, does not dare dream of the love of women. He wants to donate to the people of Genoa the island paradise called "Elysium" he has created. His friends, a group of dissolute young noblemen, have been using an underground grotto on the island for orgies with young women abducted from prominent Genoan families, and intervene with Duke Adorno to stop the transfer of ownership. One of them, Count Tamare, has set his sights on Carlotta, daughter of the Podestà. Carlotta rejects him, as she is only interested in Salvago, whose soul she wants to paint.

Act 2
Infuriated by Carlotta's rejection, Tamare swears to Adorno that he will take her by force. He also reveals the secret of the grotto to Adorno. Not wanting Salvago to become more popular than himself as a result of the gift, Adorno decides to use the existence of the secret grotto as an excuse to veto the transfer. While Salvago is sitting for Carlotta, she complains that she can't paint his soul if he keeps avoiding looking at her. To which he responds that ugly as he is, he still has the feelings of a man in the presence of a beautiful woman... Eventually Carlotta confesses that she loves him, but faints in his arms as both are overcome with emotion.

Act 3

The citizens of Genoa go to the island for the first time and are awed by what they see. Salvago asks the Podestà for Carlotta's hand in marriage. She evades him, wanders off alone, and in the grotto finally succumbs to Tamare who's wearing a mask. The Duke accuses Salvago of masterminding the abductions. Salvago, beside himself with worry for Carlotta, leads everyone to the underground grotto. Carlotta lies senseless on a bed, while Tamare prides himself on his conquering abilities. Salvago stabs him. Carlotta awakens, Salvago rushes to her side, but with her dying breath she calls for Tamare. Salvago, completely deranged, stumbles over Tamare's body as he makes his way through the stunned crowd.

Recordings(key: Conductor – Carlotta/Salvago/Tamare/Adorno/Lodovico)Winfried Zillig – Evelyn Lear/Helmut Krebs/Thomas Stewart/Franz Crass/Ernst Wiemann, recorded 1960, live in Hamburg, Voce
Michael Gielen – Card/Götz/Mora-B/Reich/Hagenau, 1979, live in Frankfurt, MRF
Gerd Albrecht – Martin-Ja/Riegel/Becht/Theo Adam/Meven, Radio-Symphonieorchester Wien, 1984, live in Salzburg, Orfeo
Edo de Waart – Marilyn Schmiege/William Cochran/Cowan/van Tassel/Oosterkamp, Netherlands Radio Chorus and Orchestra, 1990, live in Amsterdam, Marco Polo cat. 223328
Kent Nagano – Anne Schwanewilms/Robert Brubaker/Michael Volle/Hale/Schöne, Deutsches Symphonie-Orchester Berlin, 2005, video from Salzburg, incomplete, EuroArts
Philippe Auguin – Blancas/Hoare/Hendricks/Hale/Ebbecke, 2010, video from Palermo, RAI
James Conlon – Anja Kampe/Robert Brubaker/Martin Gantner/Johnson-J/Schöne, Chorus and Orchestra of Los Angeles Opera, 2010, live in Los Angeles, Bridge Records
Alejo Pérez – Hofmann-MA/Workman/Neal/Marquardt/Eder, 2015, live in Lyon, Radio France
Ingo Metzmacher – Naglestad/John Daszak/Maltman/Konieczny/Miles, 2017, video-stream from Munich, BR

References
Notes

Further reading
, Opera – Komponisten, Werke, Interpreten'', Könemann, 2000, (Dutch translation)

External links

Libretto, synopsis, opera-guide.ch 

Operas by Franz Schreker
1918 operas
Operas set in Italy
German-language operas
Operas
Operas based on plays
Adaptations of works by Frank Wedekind